During the 1999–2000 English football season, Bristol Rovers competed in the Football League Second Division.

Season summary
Bristol Rovers nearly reached the play-offs, finishing seventh that season despite never dropping out of the playoffs all season until the last day of the season with a defeat at Cardiff City.

Final league table

First-team squad
Squad at end of season

Left club during season

References

Bristol Rovers F.C. seasons
Bristol Rovers